The American automobile manufacturer GM has sold a number of trucks and SUVs under its marque GMC, which began being applied in 1912. The vast majority of GMC vehicles are based upon the same platforms as, or simply rebadged from, vehicles sold in the Chevrolet division of GM.

Current production vehicles

Former production vehicles

Light-duty trucks 

 C/E Series
 "New Design" Series
 "Blue Chip" Series
 C/K Series
 Sprint
 Caballero
 S-15
 Sonoma
 Syclone

Medium-duty trucks 

 L-Series
 GMC 5500
 C-Series
 Forward
 W-Series
 T-Series
 TopKick

Heavy-duty trucks 

 7500
 9500
 Astro
 General
 Brigadier

Vans 

 Handi-Van
 Handi-Bus
 Rally
 Vandura
 Safari

Buses 

 P-Series
 "Old Look"
 "New Look"
 RTS
 Classic
 B-Series
 S-Series

SUVs 

 Suburban
 Jimmy
 S-15 Jimmy
 Tracker
 Typhoon
 Envoy

Sedans 

 Chevette

Military vehicles 

 CCKW
 AFKWX
 DUKW

Concept vehicles 

 1950 Futurliner
 1954 XP-21 Firebird I
 1955 LaSalle II Roadster
 1955 LaSalle II Sedan
 1956 Firebird II
 1959 Firebird III
 1966 Electrovan Experimental
 1970 Urban Concept
 1992 Ultralite Experimental
 1992 Impact Concept
 2000 Terradyne
 2001 Terracross
 2002 Terra 4
 2002 Hy-Wire
 2002 Autonomy Concept
 2005 Sequel
 2005 Graphyte
 2006 PAD
 2008 Denali XT
 2010 Granite
 2010 Granite CPU

See also 

 GMC
 General Motors
 Chevrolet
 Badge engineering

References 

GMC